Roberto Tancredi (born 30 January 1944 in Montecatini Val di Cecina) is a retired Italian professional football player who played as a goalkeeper.

Career
Tancredi began playing youth football with local side Rosignano before joining Juventus F.C. He played in Serie A for Juventus, and finished his career with A.S. Livorno Calcio.

References

1944 births
Living people
Italian footballers
Serie A players
A.S. Sambenedettese players
Juventus F.C. players
Ternana Calcio players
Brescia Calcio players
U.S. Livorno 1915 players
Association football goalkeepers